This is a partial list of notable historical figures in U.S. national politics who were members of the Ku Klux Klan before taking office. Membership of the Klan is secret. Political opponents sometimes allege that a person was a member of the Klan, or was supported at the polls by Klan members.

Politicians who were active in the Klan
In 2018, The Washington Post reported that, by 1930, the KKK, while its "membership remained semi-secret, claimed 11 governors, 16 senators and as many as 75 congressmen –roughly split between Republicans 
and Democrats."

Supreme Court justices

Hugo Black 

 
In 1921, Hugo Black (D) successfully defended E. R. Stephenson in his trial for the murder of a Catholic priest, Fr. James E. Coyle. E.R. Stephenson's daughter had converted to Catholicism and married a man of Puerto Rican descent, and Coyle had conducted the wedding. Hugo Black got Stephenson acquitted in part by arguing to the jury that Puerto Ricans should be considered black under the South's one drop rule. Black, a Democrat, joined the Ku Klux Klan shortly afterwards, in order to gain votes from the anti-Catholic element in Alabama. He built his winning Senate campaign around multiple appearances at KKK meetings across Alabama. Late in life, Black told an interviewer:
 
"At that time, I was joining every organization in sight! ... In my part of Alabama, the Klan was engaged in unlawful activities ... The general feeling in the community was that if responsible citizens didn't join the Klan it would soon become dominated by the less responsible members."
 
News of his membership was a secret until shortly after he was confirmed as an Associate Justice of the United States Supreme Court. Black later said that joining the Klan was a mistake, but he went on to say, "I would have joined any group if it helped get me votes."

 
On the Supreme Court, Black wrote the opinion in Korematsu v. United States, which upheld the exclusion of Japanese Americans from the West Coast. Black also wrote the opinion in Everson v. Board of Education, a key case about the separation of church and state. Some have argued that his views on the separation of church and state were influenced by the Klan's anti-Catholicism.
 
Despite his former Klan membership, Black joined the Supreme Court's unanimous decisions in Shelley v. Kraemer (1948), which outlawed judicial enforcement of racially restrictive covenants, and Brown v Board of Education, which outlawed school segregation. Justice William Douglas would write years later that at least 3 (and possibly as many as 5) Supreme Court justices were originally planning to rule school segregation constitutional, but Black had actually been one of the four justices who were planning to strike down school segregation from the beginning of the Brown case.

Members of the Senate

Theodore G. Bilbo 

Theodore G. Bilbo (D), the U.S. Senator for Mississippi, stated he was a member of the KKK .

Joseph E. Brown 
Joseph E. Brown (D), the U.S. Senator for Georgia, was a key supporter of the KKK in his home state.

Robert C. Byrd 

 
Robert C. Byrd (D), the U.S. senator for West Virginia, a recruiter for the Klan while in his 20s and 30s, rising to the title of Kleagle and Exalted Cyclops of his local chapter. After leaving the group, Byrd spoke in favor of the Klan during his early political career. Though he later said he officially left the organization in 1943, Byrd wrote a letter in 1946 to the group's Imperial Wizard stating "The Klan is needed today as never before, and I am anxious to see its rebirth here in West Virginia." Byrd attempted to explain or defend his former membership in the Klan in his 1958 U.S. Senate campaign when he was 41 years old. Byrd, a Democrat, eventually became his party leader in the Senate.  Byrd later said joining the Klan was his "greatest mistake," and after his death, the NAACP released a statement praising Byrd, acknowledging his former affiliation with the Klan and saying that he "became a champion for civil rights and liberties" and "came to consistently support the NAACP civil rights agenda". In a 2001 interview, Byrd used the term "white niggers" twice during a national television broadcast. The full quote ran as follows: "My old mom told me, 'Robert, you can't go to heaven if you hate anybody.' We practice that. There are white niggers. I've seen a lot of white niggers in my time. I'm going to use that word. We just need to work together to make our country a better country, and I'd just as soon quit talking about it so much." Byrd later apologized for the phrase and admitted that it "has no place in today's society," and did not clarify the intended meaning of the term in his context.

John Brown Gordon 
John Brown Gordon (D), the U.S. Senator for Georgia, was a founder of the KKK in his home state of Georgia.

James Thomas Heflin 
James Thomas Heflin (1869–1951) (D), the U.S. Senator for Alabama, was suspected of being a member of the KKK.

Rufus C. Holman 
Rufus C. Holman (R), the U.S. Senator for Oregon, was an active member of the Ku Klux Klan (KKK) in Oregon, serving as an officer in that organization.

Earle Mayfield 
Earle Mayfield (1881–1964) (D), U.S. Senator (1923–1929) for Texas from 1923 through 1929. Mayfield had been a Texas Senator from 1907 through 1913.

Rice W. Means 
Rice W. Means (R), the U.S. Senator for Colorado, was the directing head of the Ku Klux Klan in Colorado.

John Tyler Morgan 
John Tyler Morgan (D) (June 20, 1824 – June 11, 1907, the U.S. Senator for Alabama (March 4, 1877, to June 11, 1907), was the Grand Dragon of the KKK in Alabama.

Edmund Pettus 
Edmund Pettus (July 6, 1821 – 1907) (D), the U.S. Senator for Alabama (1896 to 1907), was also a Grand Dragon of the KKK in Alabama.

William Bliss Pine 
William Bliss Pine (1877–1942) (R), the U.S. Senator for Oklahoma (March 4, 1925, to March 3, 1931), was a Klansman, according to historian Chalmers and the Eufaula Indian Journal.

Non-Klan Senators who received support from the Klan

Lawrence C. Phipps 
The Klan helped elect Lawrence C. Phipps (1862–1958) (R), U.S. Senator for Colorado.

Daniel F. Steck 
Daniel F. Steck (1881–1950) (D), of Iowa, in 1925, with the help of the Klan, defeated Senator Smith W. Brookhart (1869–1944) (R), a progressive. Because the vote was close, there was a recount, and Steck was the victor. Brookhart contested it. Steck reportedly had no Klan connections, except that he enlisted the Klan's top lawyer and legislative expert, William Francis Zumbrunn (1877–1930), to secure his seat in the 69th Congress (1925–1926). Earlier, Zumbrunn – with lawyer William Pinkney McLean, Jr. (1872–1937) of Fort Worth – helped seat Klan Senator from Texas, Earle Mayfield.

Frederick Steiwer 
In the 1926 Oregon election, the Ku Klux Klan, under the auspices of The Oregon Good Government League, helped Frederick Steiwer (1883–1939) win the Republican primary by spreading word that it was supporting the reelection of his opponent, Senator Robert N. Stanfield (1877–1945) (R). The effort was fueled by White Supremacist (anti-immigrant, anti-Catholic) groups in Oregon in support of the state's Compulsory Education Act, enacted in 1922, mandating  education; which would have taken effect in 1926; but the Supreme Court, in 1925, struck it down in Pierce v. Society of Sisters.

Arthur Raymond Robinson 
Arthur Raymond Robinson (1881–1961) (R), of Indiana, was, on November 2, 1925, characterized by Time magazine was follows: "The New Man. Arthur R. Robinson is only 44. He is an Indianapolis attorney, a 'good Republican' but of no particular political importance. He is said to be a good orator. Against him politically is the fact that he supported Governor Jackson in the last election and so, justly or unjustly, he is considered a 'Klan man."

Frank Willis 
According to historian Chalmers, "the Klan supported Frank B. Willis (1871–1928) (R) [of Ohio] not because it liked him, but because it disliked his anti-Klan opponent, Atlee Pomerene (1863–1937) (D), more.

Members of the House of Representatives

Clifford Davis 
Clifford Davis (D), U.S. Representative for Tennessee's 9th and 10th congressional districts was an active member in Tennessee.

George Gordon 
George Gordon (D), U.S. Representative for Tennessee's 10th congressional district, became one of the Klan's first members. In 1867, Gordon became the Klan's first Grand Dragon for the Realm of Tennessee, and wrote its Precscript, a constitution setting out the organization's purpose, principles, and the like.

William David Upshaw 
William David Upshaw (D), U.S. Representative for Georgia's 5th congressional district, was an active member in Georgia.

Governors

Homer Martin Adkins 
Homer Martin Adkins (D), (1890 – 1964) the Governor of Arkansas, was a supporter of the Klan in his home state of Arkansas.

Bibb Graves 
Bibb Graves (D), (1873 – 1942) was the Governor of Alabama. He lost his first campaign for governor in 1922, but four years later, with the secret endorsement of the Ku Klux Klan, he was elected to his first term as governor. Graves was almost certainly the Exalted Cyclops (chapter president) of the Montgomery chapter of the Klan. Graves, like Hugo Black, used the strength of the Klan to further his electoral prospects.

Edward L. Jackson 
Edward L. Jackson (R), (1873 – 1954) was the Governor of Indiana in 1925 and his administration came under fire for granting undue favor to the Klan's agenda and associates. Jackson was further damaged by the arrest and trial of Grand Dragon D. C. Stephenson for the rape and murder of Madge Oberholtzer. When it was revealed that Jackson had attempted to bribe former Gov. Warren T. McCray with $10,000 to appoint a Klansman to a local office, Jackson was taken to court. His case ended with a hung jury, and Jackson ended his political career in disgrace. There is, however, evidence that Jackson joined the KKK himself.

Clarence Morley 
Clarence Morley (R),(1869 – 1948) the Governor of Colorado, was a KKK member and a strong supporter of Prohibition. He tried to ban the Catholic Church from using sacramental wine and attempted to have the University of Colorado fire all Jewish and Catholic professors.

Tom Terral 
Tom Terral (D), ( 1882 – 1946) the Governor of Arkansas, was a member of the KKK in Louisiana.

Clifford Walker 
Clifford Walker (D), (1877 – 1954) the Governor of Georgia, was revealed to be a Klan member by the press in 1924.

Federal Judges

Elmer David Davies 
Elmer David Davies (D), a Federal Judge of the United States District Court for the Middle District of Tennessee, was a member of the KKK while at university.

Statewide Officials

Lee Cazort 
Lee Cazort (D), the Lieutenant Governor of Arkansas, was active in the Klan, and openly endorsed the Klan's platform.

John W. Morton 
John Morton (D), the Tennessee Secretary of State, was the founder of the Nashville chapter of the KKK

William L. Saunders 
William L. Saunders (D), the North Carolina Secretary of State, was the founder of the North Carolina chapter.

Local Officials
A notable number of local officials were also Klansmen, resulting in such as the "reign of terror" inflicted by Louisiana by crony "exalted cyclops": Bastrop mayor, John Killian Skipwith, known as Captain J. K. Skipwith, and Mer Rouge mayor, Bunnie McEwin McKoin, MD, better known as Dr. B. M. McKoin (and whose surname was variously misreported as McCoin, M'Koin and McKoln in media).

John Clinton Porter 
John Clinton Porter (D), was mayor of Los Angeles and an early supporter of the Klan in the 1920s.

Benjamin F. Stapleton 
Benjamin F. Stapleton (D), was Mayor of Denver in the 1920s–1940s. He was a Klan member in the early 1920s and appointed fellow Klansmen to positions in municipal government. Ultimately, Stapleton broke from the Klan and removed several Klansmen from office.

Kaspar K. Kubli 
Kap Kubli (R) Speaker of the Oregon House of Representatives from 1923 to 1924

David Duke 
David Duke (D/R), a politician who ran in both Democrat and Republican presidential primaries, was openly involved in the leadership of the Ku Klux Klan.  He was founder and Grand Wizard of the Knights of the Ku Klux Klan in the mid-1970s; he re-titled his position as "National Director" and said that the KKK needed to "get out of the cow pasture and into hotel meeting rooms". He left the organization in 1980.  He ran for president in the 1988 Democratic presidential primaries. In 1989 Duke switched political parties from Democrat to Republican.  In 1989, he became a member of the Louisiana State Legislature from the 81st district, and was Republican Party chairman for St. Tammany Parish.

Allegations of Klan membership

Edward Douglass White 

Edward Douglass White, a Democrat and the Chief Justice of the United States, was alleged to be a Klansman in one unverified source. More complete is legal historian Paul Finkelman in American National Biography (2000) about that single report: "Although the moviemaker D. W. Griffith claimed White endorsed his racist movie, The Birth of a Nation (1915), and asserted that White had been in the Ku Klux Klan, there is no evidence to support either of Griffith's contentions."

Warren G. Harding 
The consensus of modern historians is that Warren Harding was never a member, and instead was an important enemy of the Klan. While one source claims Warren G. Harding, a Republican, was a Ku Klux Klan member while President, that claim is based on a third-hand account of a second-hand recollection in 1985 of a deathbed statement made sometime in the late 1940s concerning an incident in the early 1920s. Independent investigations have turned up many contradictions and no supporting evidence for the claim. Historians reject the claim and note that Harding in fact publicly fought and spoke against the Klan.

The rejected claim was made by Wyn Craig Wade. He stated Harding's membership as fact and gives a detailed account of a secret swearing-in ceremony in the White House, based on a private communication he received in 1985 from journalist Stetson Kennedy. Kennedy, in turn had, along with Elizabeth Gardner, tape recorded some time in the "late 1940s" a deathbed confession of former Imperial Klokard Alton Young. Young claimed to have been a member of the "Presidential Induction Team".  Young also said on his deathbed that he had repudiated racism.  In his book, The Strange Deaths of President Harding, historian Robert Ferrell says he was unable to find any records of any such "ceremony" in which Harding was brought into the Klan in the White House. John Dean, in his 2004 book Warren G. Harding, also could find no proof of Klan membership or activity on the part of Harding.  Review of the personal records of Harding's Personal White House Secretary, George Christian Jr., also do not support the contention that Harding received members of the Klan while in office.  Appointment books maintained in the White House, detailing President Harding's daily schedules, do not show any such event.

In their 2005 book Freakonomics, University of Chicago economist Steven D. Levitt and journalist Stephen J. Dubner alluded to Warren Harding's possible Klan affiliation. However, in a New York Times Magazine Freakonomics column, entitled "Hoodwinked? Does it matter if an activist who exposes the inner workings of the Ku Klux Klan isn't open about how he got those secrets?", Dubner and Levitt said that they no longer accepted Stetson Kennedy's testimony about Harding and the Klan.

The 1920 Republican Party platform, which essentially expressed Harding's political philosophy, called for Congress to pass laws combating lynching.  Harding denounced lynching in a landmark 21 October 1921 speech in Birmingham, Alabama, which was covered in the national press.  Harding also vigorously supported an anti-lynching bill in Congress during his term in the White House. His "comments about race and equality were remarkable for 1921."

Payne argues that the Klan was so angry with Harding's attacks on the KKK that it originated and spread the false rumor that he was a member.

Carl S. Anthony, biographer of Harding's wife, found no such proof of Harding's membership in the Klan. He does however discuss the events leading up to the period when the alleged Klan ceremony was held in June 1923:

[K]nowing that some branches of the Shriners were anti-Catholic and in that sense sympathetic to the Ku Klax Klan and that the Klan itself was holding a demonstration less than a half mile from Washington, Harding censured hate groups in his Shriners speech.  The press "considered [it] a direct attack" on the Klan, particularly in light of his criticism weeks earlier of "factions of hatred and prejudice and violence [that] challeng[ed] both civil and religious liberty".

In 2005, The Straight Dope presented a summary of many of these arguments against Harding's membership, and noted that, while it might have been politically expedient for him to join the KKK in public, to do it in private would have been of no benefit to him.

It was falsely rumored, in his lifetime, that Harding was partly of African-American descent, so he would have been an unlikely recruit for the Ku Klux Klan.

Calvin Coolidge 
One common misconception is that President Calvin Coolidge was a Klan member, a claim that Klan websites have spread. In reality, Coolidge was adamantly opposed to the Klan. According to Jerry L. Wallace at the Coolidge Foundation, "Coolidge expressed his antipathy to the Klan by reaching out in a positive, public way directly to its victims: Blacks, Jews, Catholics, and immigrants, with whom he had good relations—especially so for Irish Catholics—going back long before the rise of the Invisible Empire . . . [and] sought to highlight their positive achievements and contributions to American life." Ironically, many Klan members voted for the Republican Coolidge in the 1924 presidential election because the Democratic presidential nominee John W. Davis denounced the Klan at the party's convention.

Harry S. Truman 
Harry S. Truman, the Democratic politician who became president in 1945, was accused by opponents of having dabbled with the Klan briefly. In 1924, he was a judge in Jackson County, Missouri. Truman was up for reelection, and his friends Edgar Hinde and Spencer Salisbury advised him to join the Klan. The Klan was politically powerful in Jackson County, and two of Truman's opponents in the Democratic primary had Klan support. Truman refused at first, but paid the Klan's $10 membership fee, and a meeting with a Klan officer was arranged.

According to Salisbury's version of the story,  Truman was inducted, but afterward "was never active; he was just a member who wouldn't do anything". Salisbury, however, told the story after he became Truman's bitter enemy, so historians are reluctant to believe his claims.

According to Hinde and Margaret Truman's accounts, the Klan officer demanded that Truman pledge not to hire any Catholics or Jews if he was reelected. Truman refused, and demanded the return of his $10 membership fee; most of the men he had commanded in World War I had been local Irish Catholics.

Truman had at least one other strong reason to object to the anti-Catholic requirement, which was that the Catholic Pendergast family, which operated a political machine in Jackson County, were his patrons; Pendergast family lore has it that Truman was originally accepted for patronage without even meeting him, on the basis of his family background plus the fact that he was not a member of any anti-Catholic organization such as the Klan. The Pendergast faction of the Democratic Party was known as the "Goats", as opposed to the rival Shannon machine's "Rabbits". The battle lines were drawn when Truman put only Goats on the county payroll, and the Klan began encouraging voters to support Protestant, "100% American" candidates, allying itself against Truman and with the Rabbits, while Shannon instructed his people to vote Republican in the election, which Truman lost.

Truman later claimed that the Klan "threatened to kill me, and I went out to one of their meetings and dared them to try", speculating that if Truman's armed friends had shown up earlier, violence might have resulted. However, biographer Alonzo Hamby believes that this story, which is not supported by any recorded facts, was a confabulation based on a meeting with a hostile and menacing group of Democrats that contained many Klansmen, showing Truman's "Walter Mitty-like tendency ... to rewrite his personal history". Sympathetic observers see Truman's flirtation with the Klan as a momentary aberration, point out that his close friend and business partner Eddie Jacobson was Jewish, and say that in later years Truman's presidency marked the first significant improvement in the federal government's record on civil rights since the post-Reconstruction nadir marked by the Wilson administration.

Lyndon B. Johnson 
An anonymous person told the FBI that Ned O'Neal Touchstone (1926–1988) – newspaper publisher who has been chronicled as influential in radical right politics in Louisiana politics during the 1960s – was a member of a group that called itself  "the Original Members of the Ku Klux Klan" and that in 1963 he claimed that the group had documented proof of Lyndon Johnson having been a member of some KKK group in the 1930s.

See also 
 Ku Klux Klan in Inglewood, California
 Ku Klux Klan in Canada
 Ku Klux Klan in Maine
 History of the Ku Klux Klan in New Jersey
 Ku Klux Klan in Oregon

Bibliography

Annotations

Notes

News media 

 
 
 

  ; .
  The Spot → political blog of the Denver Post.

  , .
  (taped March 2, 2001; posted to YouTube January 17, 2009).

  ; .

 

 
 
 
 .
 .
 .
 {{cite news |ref= |last1=New York Times, The |author-link1=The New York Times |date=November 6, 1924 |title=Victories by Klan Feature Election – Order Elects Senators in Oklahoma and Colorado, Governors in Kansas, Indiana, Colorado – All on Republican Ticket – Only Setback for Ku Klux Was Triumph of Mrs. Ferguson as Democratic Governor of Texas |work=The New York Times |url=https://nyti.ms/3m8mSPo |language=en-US |volume=74 |issue=24388 |page=1 (column 7) & p. 3 |access-date=August 13, 2021 |via=TimesMachine |url-access=subscription }}
 .
 
   (U.S. Newsstream database).

 

  .

 

   (U.S. Newsstream database).
   (U.S. Newsstream database).
   (U.S. Newsstream database).
 

 Books, journals, magazines, papers, websites 

 
 

 
  (article).
 

 

 

   (publication);  (article).

  .

  , 
  ; ; .
  ; .

 
   (publication);  (article).
  (jacksonianamerica.com is a website maintained by the author)

  ; ; .
  ; ; .

  "Justice Hugo Black explained in a 5–4 decision why this wall did not stand in the way of a New Jersey law covering the bus fares of Catholic-school students. (This article appeared in the United States section of the print edition under the headline "Cross Roads").

  ; ; .
  ;  (full set, Vol. 23);  (Vol. 23).
   (article).

 
 
  ; ; .
  ; ; .

  .
  ; .

  (reprint from an earlier post → ).

  . → Subtitle: "In the 1920s, during what historians call the KKK's 'second wave,' Klan members served in all levels of American government."
(see ).
 
  ;  (article).

 

 

  ; ; .

 
  ;  (full set);  (Vol. 1); .
  ; ; .
  → .  (publication).

 

  ; ; .
 
  ;  ("Political Party Platforms").

  ; ; .

 Government and genealogical archives 

  .

 Sources by the Klan or known exponents of the Klan 

    (microfilm & digital); .
 

  → Printed secretly in the office of the Pulaski Citizen by its publisher, Lapsley D. McCord (1847–1920) (Horn). → This copy of the Prescript'' was formerly the property of Col. Martin Luther Stansel (1822–1902), a lawyer from Pickens County, Alabama, and one of the organizers of the original Ku Klux Klan → reprinted 1903 → revised 1904 → ; .

Political history of the United States
United States politics-related lists
Anti-Catholicism in the United States
Antisemitism in the United States
History of racism in the United States